Arsène Hobou (born 30 October 1967) is an Ivorian former footballer. He played in 37 matches for the Ivory Coast national football team from 1987 to 1996. He was also named in the Ivory Coast's squad for the 1988 African Cup of Nations tournament.

References

External links
 

1967 births
Living people
Ivorian footballers
Ivory Coast international footballers
1988 African Cup of Nations players
1990 African Cup of Nations players
1992 African Cup of Nations players
Africa Cup of Nations-winning players
1992 King Fahd Cup players
Place of birth missing (living people)
Association football defenders